The Clisbako Caldera Complex (also called the Cheslatta Caldera Complex) is a large dissected caldera complex in the Chilcotin Group and Anahim Volcanic Belt in central British Columbia, Canada. Rocks within the caldera range in composition from basalt to rhyolite.

See also
Volcanism of Canada
Volcanism of Western Canada
List of volcanoes in Canada

References
Clisbako Caldera Complex

Calderas of British Columbia
Nechako Country
Eocene calderas
Polygenetic volcanoes